China Corsair is a 1951 American adventure film directed by Ray Nazarro, starring Jon Hall and Lisa Ferraday and released by Columbia Pictures. It was the film debut of Ernest Borgnine.

Filming took place in February 1951. Ron Randell was under long term contract to Columbia.

Plot
McMillen is cheated out of his winnings in a gambling club. The winnings were the last of his money, so he gets a job on a ship as the engineer. Tamara rescues shipwrecked McMillen. While romance blossoms, the pair try to prevent a crook from selling her uncle’s priceless collection of antique jade.

Cast
Jon Hall - McMillan
Lisa Ferraday - Tamara
Ron Randell - Paul Lowell
Douglas Kennedy - Capt. Frenchy
Ernest Borgnine - Hu Chang
John Dehner - Pedro
Marya Marco - Lotus
Philip Ahn - Wong San
Peter Mamakos - Juan
Amanda Blake - Jane Richards

Reception
The New York Daily News described the flick as "a preposterous affair" and noted Borgnine's role as a "Chinese villain" as unconvincing. Filmink called it "terrific".

References

External links

1951 films
Columbia Pictures films
1951 adventure films
American black-and-white films
American adventure films
1950s English-language films
Films directed by Ray Nazarro
1950s American films